

The voiced velar lateral tap is an allophone of the velar lateral approximant in some languages of New Guinea, such as Kanite and Melpa.

There is no specific symbol for this sound. However, an IPA capital L with a breve for extra-short, would capture Ladefoged and Maddieson's description.

Features

References 

Lateral consonants
Velar consonants
Tap and flap consonants
Pulmonic consonants